A planarian is one of the many  flatworms of the traditional class Turbellaria. It usually describes free-living flatworms of the order  Tricladida (triclads), although this common name is also used for a wide number of free-living platyhelminthes. Planaria are common to many parts of the world, living in both saltwater and freshwater ponds and rivers. Some species are terrestrial and are found under logs, in or on the soil, and on plants in humid areas.

The triclads are characterized by triply branched intestine and anteriorly situated ovaries, next to the brain. Today the order Tricladida is split into three suborders, according to their phylogenetic relationships: Maricola, Cavernicola and Continenticola. Formerly, the Tricladida was split according to habitats: Maricola, which is marine; Paludicola which inhabits freshwater; and Terricola, which is land-dwelling.

Planaria exhibit an extraordinary ability to regenerate lost body parts. For example, a planarian split lengthwise or crosswise will regenerate into two separate individuals. Some planarian species have two eye-spots (also known as ocelli) that can detect the intensity of light, while others have several eye-spots. The eye-spots act as photoreceptors and are used to move away from light sources. Planaria have three germ layers (ectoderm, mesoderm, and endoderm), and are acoelomate (they have a very solid body with no body cavity). They have a single-opening digestive tract; in Tricladida planarians this consists of one anterior branch and two posterior branches.

Planarians move by beating cilia on the ventral dermis, allowing them to glide along on a film of mucus. Some also may move by undulations of the whole body by the contractions of muscles built into the body membrane.

Triclads play an important role in watercourse ecosystems and are often very important as bio-indicators.

The most frequently used planarian in high school and first-year college laboratories is the brownish Girardia tigrina. Other common species used are the blackish Planaria maculata and Girardia dorotocephala. Recently, however, the species Schmidtea mediterranea has emerged as the species of choice for modern molecular biological and genomic research due to its diploid chromosomes and the existence of both asexual and sexual strains. Recent genetic screens utilizing double-stranded RNA technology have uncovered 240 genes that affect regeneration in S. mediterranea. Many of these genes have orthologs in the human genome.

Anatomy and physiology
The planarian has very simple organ systems. The digestive system consists of a mouth, pharynx, and a gastrovascular cavity. The mouth is located in the middle of the underside of the body. Digestive enzymes are secreted from the mouth to begin external digestion. The pharynx connects the mouth to the gastrovascular cavity. This structure branches throughout the body allowing nutrients from food to reach all extremities. Planaria eat living or dead small animals that they suck up with their muscular mouths. Food passes from the mouth through the pharynx into the intestines where it is digested by the cells lining the intestines. Then its nutrients diffuse to the rest of the planaria.

Planaria receive oxygen and release carbon dioxide by diffusion. The excretory system is made of many tubes with many flame cells and excretory pores on them. Also, flame cells remove unwanted liquids from the body by passing them through ducts which lead to excretory pores, where waste is released on the dorsal surface of the planarian.

The triclads have an anterior end or head where sense organs, such as eyes and chemoreceptors, are usually found. Some species have auricles that protrude from the margins of the head. The auricles can contain chemical and mechanical sensory receptors.

The number of eyes in the triclads is variable depending on the species. While many species have two eyes (e.g. Dugesia or Microplana), others have many more distributed along the body (e.g. most Geoplaninae). Sometimes, those species with two eyes may present smaller accessory or supernumerary eyes. The subterranean triclads are often eyeless or blind.

The body of the triclads is covered by a ciliated epidermis that contains rhabdites. Between the epidermis and the gastrodermis there is a parenchymatous tissue or mesenchyme.

Nervous system

The head of the planarian evolved through cephalisation; the planarian head has a ganglion under the eyespots. The cerebral ganglia, a bi-lobed mass of nerve tissue, is sometimes referred to as the planarian “brain” and has been shown to exhibit spontaneous electrophysiological oscillations, similar to the electroencephalographic (EEG) activity of other animals. From the ganglion there are two nerve cords which extend along the length of the tail. There are many transverse nerves connected to the nerve cords extending from the brain, which makes the nerve system look like a ladder. With a ladder-like nerve system, it is able to respond in a coordinated manner.

The planarian has a soft, flat, wedge-shaped body that may be black, brown, blue, gray, or white. The blunt, triangular head has two ocelli (eyespots), pigmented areas that are sensitive to light. There are two auricles (earlike projections) at the base of the head, which are sensitive to touch and the presence of certain chemicals. The mouth is located in the middle of the underside of the body, which is covered with hairlike projections (cilia). There are no circulatory or respiratory systems; oxygen enters and carbon dioxide leaves the planarian's body by diffusing through the body wall.

Reproduction

There are sexual and asexual planarian. Sexual planarian are hermaphrodites, possessing both testicles and ovaries. Thus, one of their gametes will combine with the gamete of another planarian. Each planarian transports its secretion to the other planarian, giving and receiving sperm. Eggs develop inside the body and are shed in capsules. Weeks later, the eggs hatch and grow into adults. In asexual reproduction, the planarian detaches its tail end and each half regrows the lost parts by regeneration, allowing endoblasts (adult stem cells) to divide and differentiate, thus resulting in two worms. Some researchers claim that the products derived from bisecting planarian are similar to the products of planarian asexual reproduction; however, debates about the nature of asexual reproduction in planaria and its effect on the population are ongoing. Some species of planarian are exclusively asexual, whereas some can reproduce both sexually and asexually. In most of the cases the sexual reproduction involve two individuals; auto fecundation has been rarely reported (e.g. in Cura foremanii).

As a model system in biological and biomedical research 
The life history of planarians make them a model system for investigating a number of biological processes, many of which may have implications for human health and disease. Advances in molecular genetic technologies has made the study of gene function possible in these animals and scientists are studying them worldwide. Like other invertebrate model organisms, for example C. elegans and D. melanogaster, the relative simplicity of planarians facilitates experimental study.

Planarians have a number of cell types, tissues and simple organs that are homologous to our own cells, tissues and organs. However, regeneration has attracted the most attention. Thomas Hunt Morgan was responsible for some of the first systematic studies (that still underpin modern research) before the advent of molecular biology as a discipline.

Planarians are also an emerging model organism for aging research. These animals have an apparently limitless regenerative capacity, and the asexual animals seem to maintain their telomerase levels throughout their lifetime, making them "effectively immortal".

Regeneration 
Planarian can be cut into pieces, and each piece can regenerate into a complete organism. Cells at the location of the wound site proliferate to form a blastema that will differentiate into new tissues and regenerate the missing parts of the piece of the cut planaria. It's this feature that gave them the famous designation of being "immortal under the edge of a knife."  Very small pieces of the planarian, estimated to be as little as 1/279th of the organism it is cut from, can regenerate back into a complete organism over the course of a few weeks. New tissues can grow due to pluripotent stem cells that have the ability to create all the various cell types. These adult stem cells are called endoblasts, and comprise 20% or more of the cells in the adult animal. They are the only proliferating cells in the worm, and they differentiate into progeny that replace older cells. In addition, existing tissue is remodeled to restore symmetry and proportion of the new planaria that forms from a piece of a cut up organism.

The organism itself does not have to be completely cut into separate pieces for the regeneration phenomenon to be witnessed. In fact, if the head of a planarian is cut in half down its center, and each side retained on the organism, it is possible for the planarian to regenerate two heads and continue to live. Researchers, including those from Tufts University in the U.S., sought to determine how microgravity and micro-geomagnetic fields would affect the growth and regeneration of planarian flatworms, Dugesia japonica. They discovered that one of the amputated fragments sent to space regenerated into a double-headed worm. The majority of such amputated worms (95%) did not do so, however. An amputated worm regenerated into a double-head creature after spending five weeks aboard the International Space Station (ISS) – though regeneration of amputated worms as double-headed heteromorphosis is not a rare phenomenon unique to a microgravity environment.  In contrast, two-headed planaria regenerates can be induced by exposing amputated fragments to electrical fields. Such exposure with opposite polarity can induce a planarian with 2 tails. Two-headed planaria regenerates can be induced by treating amputated fragments with pharmacological agents that alter levels of calcium, cyclic AMP, and protein kinase C activity in cells, as well as by genetic expression blocks (interference RNA) to the canonical Wnt/β-Catenin signalling pathway.

Biochemical memory experiments

In 1955, Robert Thompson and James V. McConnell conditioned planarian flatworms by pairing a bright light with an electric shock. After repeating this several times they took away the electric shock, and only exposed them to the bright light. The flatworms would react to the bright light as if they had been shocked. Thompson and McConnell found that if they cut the worm in two, and allowed both worms to regenerate each half would develop the light-shock reaction. In 1963, McConnell repeated the experiment, but instead of cutting the trained flatworms in two he ground them into small pieces and fed them to other flatworms.  He reported that the flatworms learned to associate the bright light with a shock much faster than flatworms who had not been fed trained worms.

This experiment intended to show that memory could be transferred chemically. The experiment was repeated with mice, fish, and rats, but it always failed to produce the same results. The perceived explanation was that rather than memory being transferred to the other animals, it was the hormones in the ingested ground animals that changed the behavior. McConnell believed that this was evidence of a chemical basis for memory, which he identified as memory RNA. McConnell's results are now attributed to observer bias. No blinded experiment has ever reproduced his results of planarians scrunching when exposed to light.  Subsequent explanations of this scrunching behaviour associated with cannibalism of trained planarian worms were that the untrained flatworms were only following tracks left on the dirty glassware rather than absorbing the memory of their fodder.

In 2012, Tal Shomrat and Michael Levin have shown that planarians exhibit evidence of long-term memory retrieval after regenerating a new head.

Phylogeny and taxonomy

Phylogeny
Phylogenetic supertree after Sluys et al., 2009:

Taxonomy 

Linnaean ranks after Sluys et al., 2009:
 Order Tricladida
 Suborder Maricola
 Superfamily Cercyroidea
 Family Centrovarioplanidae
 Family Cercyridae
 Family Meixnerididae
 Superfamily Bdellouroidea
 Family Uteriporidae
 Family Bdellouridae
 Superfamily Procerodoidea
 Family Procerodidae
 Suborder Cavernicola
 Family Dimarcusidae
 Suborder Continenticola
 Superfamily Planarioidea
 Family Planariidae
 Family Dendrocoelidae
 Family Kenkiidae
 Superfamily Geoplanoidea
 Family Dugesiidae
 Family Geoplanidae

See also

References

External links 

 More information on freshwater planarians and their biology
 More information on the genetic screen to identify regeneration genes
 YouTube videos: Planaria eating worm segment, Planarian
 Schmidtea mediterranea, facts, anatomy, image at GeoChemBio.com
Alejandro Sanchez-Alvarado's Seminar: Regeneration in Planarians
 Link to an article discussing some work on planarian immortality
 A user-friendly visualization tool and database of planarian regeneration experiments
 
 Tricladida on the Encyclopedia of Life (EOL)
 Land planarians on the UF / IFAS Featured Creatures Web site

Turbellaria
Animal models
Negligibly senescent organisms
Articles containing video clips
Invertebrate common names